Yevgeni Borisovich Khrabrostin (born 15 August 1951) is a former Russian football player.

His son, also called Yevgeni Khrabrostin, also played football professionally, including a stint in the Russian Football Premier League with FC KAMAZ Naberezhnye Chelny.

Honours
Torpedo Moscow
Soviet Top League champion: 1976 (autumn)
Soviet Top League bronze: 1977
Soviet Cup finalist: 1977

References

1951 births
Living people
Soviet footballers
Soviet Top League players
FC SKA Rostov-on-Don players
FC Torpedo Moscow players
FC Znamya Truda Orekhovo-Zuyevo players
Place of birth missing (living people)
Association football forwards
FC Spartak Ryazan players
FC Dynamo Kirov players